The film Shaun of the Dead has been adapted into a  comic book twice.

2000 AD
The comic anthology 2000 AD produced a Shaun of the Dead strip called "There's Something About Mary" which was written by Simon Pegg and Edgar Wright, with art by Frazer Irving. It was published as part of the run up to the film and followed Mary, the first zombie, and other characters.

 Shaun of the Dead: "There's Something About Mary" (by Simon Pegg, Edgar Wright and Frazer Irving, in 2000 AD #1384, 2004) 

The DVD extras include the 2000 AD strip (in "Zombie Gallery" within the "Raw Meat" section) by Irving, and three new strips, drawn by Oscar Wright and narrated by the characters, which fill in the plot holes (in, appropriately, "Plot Holes" within the "Missing Bits" section).

IDW Publishing
IDW Publishing produced a comic book adaptation of the film, written by IDW's editor-in-chief Chris Ryall and drawn by Zach Howard. It was published as a four-issue mini-series in 2005.

See also
 List of comics based on films

References

External links
2000 AD profile
Complete list of DVD extras
IDW's adaptation

IDW Publishing titles
Zombies in comics
Comics based on films
2000 AD comic strips